The 2009 Hazfi Cup Final was a two-legged football tie in order to determine the 2008–09 Hazfi Cup champion of Iranian football clubs. Rah Ahan faced Zob Ahan in this final game. The first leg took place on May 18, 2009 at 17:00 local time (UTC+3:30) at Rah Ahan Stadium in Ekbatan and the second leg took place on May 22, 2009 at 17:00 local time (UTC+3:30) at Foolad Shahr Stadium, Fooladshahr.

Format 
The rules for the final were exactly the same as the one in the previous knockout rounds. The tie was contested over two legs with away goals deciding the winner if the two teams were level on goals after the second leg. If the teams could still not be separated at that stage, then extra time would have been played with a penalty shootout (taking place if the teams were still level after extra time).

Route to the final

Final Summary

Leg 1

Leg 2

Champions

See also 
 2008–09 Persian Gulf Cup
 2008–09 Azadegan League
 2008–09 Iran Football's 2nd Division
 2008–09 Iran Football's 3rd Division
 2008–09 Hazfi Cup
 Iranian Super Cup
 2008–09 Iranian Futsal Super League

2009
Haz
May 2009 sports events in Asia